Denise McCluggage (January 20, 1927 – May 6, 2015) was an American auto racing driver, journalist, author and photographer. McCluggage was a pioneer of equality for women in the U.S., both in motorsports and in journalism. She was born in El Dorado, Kansas, and spent her childhood in that state. She graduated Phi Beta Kappa from Mills College in Oakland, California. She began her career as a journalist at the San Francisco Chronicle.

Auto racing
In San Francisco in the early 1950s, while covering a yacht race, she met Briggs Cunningham, who built the first American cars to race at Le Mans. She bought her first sports car, an MG TC Midget, and began racing at small club events. In 1954 she moved to New York to work at the New York Herald Tribune as a sports journalist. The MG was replaced with a Jaguar XK140; she began to race professionally, and earned the respect of her male counterparts. Her trademark was a white helmet with pink dots. Her racing achievements included winning the grand touring category at Sebring in a Ferrari 250 GT in 1961, and a class win in the Monte Carlo Rally in a Ford Falcon in 1964.  She also participated in the Nürburgring 1000 km sports car race.  She drove Porsches, Maseratis, and other racing cars of many marques, often with another woman driver, Pinkie Rollo. She ended her racing career in the late 1960s.

Publishing
She helped launch the U.S. automotive magazine Competition Press, now AutoWeek. She wrote many columns for AutoWeek, and was a Senior Contributing Editor there until her death on May 6, 2015.

Skiing

In the mid-1950s, after a failed lobbying attempt to get the State of New York to develop a new ski area on Hunter Mountain, the original investor group contacted McCluggage, then a sports reporter at the New York Herald Tribune. They told her they had a mountain to give away to any developer who would build a ski area called "Hunter Mountain". McCluggage wrote an article that attracted the interest of a group of Broadway show-business people.

In 1977 McCluggage authored the book  The Centered Skier, published by Vermont Crossroads Press owned by Constance Cappel and R. A. Montgomery. It mixed elements of sports psychology and Zen Buddhism highlighted by calligraphy by Al Huang. It became the foundation of approaches taken by the likes of the Sugarbush Ski School.  On the Professional Ski Instructors of America reading list, the book had a resurgence when parabolic shaped skis were invented in the mid-1990s, putting carved turns, rather than skidded turns, within reach for recreational skiers.

Journalism
She held both the Ken W. Purdy Award for Excellence in Automotive Journalism and the Dean Batchelor Lifetime Achievement Award. She was presented a lifetime achievement award by the IAMA and is the only journalist to have been inducted into the Automotive Hall of Fame. Her weekly syndicated column called "Drive, She Said" appeared in some 90 newspapers across the U.S. and Canada.

McCluggage was the author of a number of books including The Centered Skier and By Brooks Too Broad for Leaping (a collection of pieces from AutoWeek). She wrote the text to accompany Tom Burnside's photographs for American Racing: Road Racing in the 50s and 60s.
She also wrote Are You a ‘Woman Driver?’.

Personal life
McCluggage was married for one year to actor Michael Conrad. She died on May 6, 2015, aged 88. She was inducted into the Automotive Hall of Fame in 2001 and Sebring Hall of Fame in 2012.

References

External links
 
 Biodata, theHenryFord.org
 Denise McCluggage official website
 Profile, roadandtravel.com
 Profile, racingsportscars.com
 Profile, RaceLegends.com
 Profile, TheCarConnection.com
 Sugarbush Ski School website
 Denise McCluggage profile, BeyondButler.wix.com

Motoring writers
1927 births
2015 deaths
American female racing drivers
American women journalists
Racing drivers from Kansas
San Francisco Chronicle people
Mills College alumni
New York Herald Tribune people
20th-century American women writers
20th-century American non-fiction writers
Journalists from Kansas
Place of birth missing
21st-century American women